Ganoderma lucidum is a red-colored species of Ganoderma with a limited distribution in Europe and parts of China, where it grows on decaying hardwood trees. Wild populations have been found in the United States in California and Utah, but were likely introduced anthropogenically and naturalized.

Etymology
The scientific name, Ganoderma lucidum, uses the genus name, Ganoderma (derived from the Greek ganos/γάνος "brightness, sheen", hence "shining" and derma/δέρμα "skin") combined with lucidum from Latin for "lucidus" as light, bright or clear.

Taxonomy and history 
The history of the Ganoderma lucidum taxon is tied to the history of Ganoderma as a genus. Karsten first described the Ganoderma in 1881 and included only one species in the genus, G. lucidum (Curtis) Karst. Previously, it was called Boletus lucidus Curtis (1781) and then Polyporus lucidus (Curtis) Fr. (1821). Patouillard revised Karsten's genus Ganoderma to include all species with pigmented spores, adhering tubes and laccate-crusted cuticles, which resulted in a total of 48 species classified under the genus Ganoderma in his 1889 monograph.

Despite this recognition of additional species and subsequent discoveries of new Ganoderma species, such as 17 new North American species identified by Murrill North in 1902, the taxonomy of Ganoderma species has remained chaotic, and the species name Ganoderma lucidum continues to be used for most Ganoderma species, including commonly misidentifying Ganoderma lingzhi (also known as reishi mushroom (Japan) or lingzhi/ling chih (China)), the sought-after red Ganoderma species used in traditional Asian medicine. It is important to note that G. lucidum is not a synonym for G. lingzhi and is not in the same clade: based on molecular phylogenetic analyses, G. lucidum is more closely related to North American species Ganoderma tsugae and Ganoderma oregonense than to G. lingzhi, whose sister taxa include Ganoderma curtisii and Ganoderma ravenelii.

These genetic analyses tested species concept hypotheses to determine how the Ganoderma taxa are related. One such study found six major clades among the 29 samples studied. Samples labeled as G. lucidum were found in five of the six clades, showing the extent of the confusion around species identification. Another study found similar results, and also showed that Ganoderma resinaceum from Europe and the North American sample wrongly labeled G. lucidum were sister taxa and were also more closely related to each other than the European G. lucidum sensu stricto. A recent multilocus phylogeny, using ITS, tef, rpb1, and rpb2, revealed that the global diversity of the Ganoderma species included three supported major lineages. These results agree with several of the earlier works focusing mostly on morphology, geography and host preference, but with statistical support separating the European and North American taxa. The phylogenetic species concept using a multilocus approach is currently the most robust and accepted method for designating species ranks for the fungi.

Description 
Ganoderma lucidum has a limited distribution in Europe and parts of China, where it grows on decaying hardwood trees.

The fruiting body almost always has a stipe present, which is tawny to russet colored and 1.5 times the diameter of the cap. Context tissue (sterile tissue inside the fruiting body between the pileus crust and the initiation of the tubes) is pink-buff to cinnamon-buff and corky, showing concentric growth zones and no resinous or melanoid deposits. The hymenium displays 4–5 pores per millimetre. Chlamydospores are absent. Basidiospores are 8.2–12.1 μm (average 10.7 μm) long and 4.8–8.9 μm (average 7.1 μm) wide, with a spore shape index of 66.2.

Uses 
The species is inedible but is used to make a bitter-tasting tea.

Folklore products and tissue culture samples 
The confusion surrounding the taxonomy of Ganoderma species has persisted, causing confusion and inaccuracies when labeling folklore products containing Ganoderma species, as well as "grow your own" (GYO) kits and other tissue samples sold for cultivation of Ganoderma species. Products typically carry a label of G. lucidum, using the words "reishi" and "lingzhi/ling chih" (which most typically refer to Asian Ganoderma species used in traditional medicine, such as G. lingzhi and Ganoderma sinense) merely because they contain a laccate Ganoderma species.

These products and GYO kits sold as Ganoderma lucidum may not contain G. lucidum: one study showed through DNA analysis that 93% of GYO kits and half of the dried mushroom products studied that were labeled "G. lucidum" contained G. lingzhi in actuality, an inaccurate labeling. The study also found that no manufactured reishi product and only one GYO kit actually contained G. lucidum. Other species present in these products included Ganoderma applanatum, Ganoderma australe (potentially a species complex), Ganoderma gibbosum, Ganoderma sessile, and G. sinense.

References

Ganodermataceae
Inedible fungi
Taxa named by Petter Adolf Karsten